The 2017–18 Hamburger SV season was the 99th season in the football club's history and 55th consecutive and overall season in the top flight of German football, the Bundesliga, having been promoted from the Oberliga Nord in 1963. Finishing 17th, Hamburg was relegated for the first time in the Bundesliga's 55-year history. In addition to the domestic league, Hamburger SV also participated in this season's edition of the domestic cup, the DFB-Pokal. This was the 65th season for Hamburg in the Volksparkstadion, located in Hamburg, Germany. The season covers a period from 1 July 2017 to 30 June 2018.

Players

Squad information

Competitions

Overview

Bundesliga

League table

Results summary

Results by round

Matches

DFB-Pokal

References

Hamburger SV seasons
Hamburger SV